Ross Stephenson Moore (1809 – 5 October 1855) was an Irish Conservative Party politician.

Moore was elected Conservative Member of Parliament (MP) for Armagh City at the 1852 general election but died before sitting for a full term in 1855.

References

External links
 

1809 births
1855 deaths
Irish Conservative Party MPs
Members of the Parliament of the United Kingdom for County Armagh constituencies (1801–1922)
UK MPs 1847–1852